Minor Thread is a handmade goods company from California, founded in 2003.

History
Minor Thread began in Oakland, California as a line of one-off totes and accessories made from recycled materials. The company moved to Los Angeles in 2009 and has begun creating organic tea and spice blends, along with organic herbal sachets.

References

 
 
 
  
  
 

2002 establishments in California
Companies based in Oakland, California